The  was a DC electric multiple unit (EMU) commuter train type operated by the private railway operator Tobu Railway in Japan.

The 7300 series sets were built between September 1959 and 1964 from 58 former 63 series EMU cars purchased from both JNR and Meitetsu, with new bodies based on the 7800 series design. The last remaining sets were withdrawn by September 1984.

Interior
Passenger accommodation consisted of longitudinal bench seating throughout.

Preserved examples
One car, MoHa 7329, is preserved at the Tobu Dobutsu-koen amusement park.

References

Electric multiple units of Japan
7300 series
Train-related introductions in 1959